Viron Peter Vaky (September 13, 1925 – November 22, 2012) was an American diplomat who was United States Ambassador to Costa Rica (1972–74), Colombia (1974–76), and Venezuela (1976). He was a member of  the American Academy of Diplomacy and Council on Foreign Relations.

Life

Career 
Viron P. Vaky was born in Corpus Christi, Texas, on September 13, 1925, as a son of Greek immigrants. During the Second World War, he was part of the Army Signal Corps, while graduating from the Georgetown School of Foreign Service in 1947. One year later, he obtained an MA in international relations from the University of Chicago. In 1949, Vaky joined the Foreign Service and went on to serve as career diplomat until 1980, when he retired from the State Department. Following this, he taught at the Georgetown School of Foreign Service, ultimately becoming an associate dean.

Vaky and the overthrow of Salvador Allende 
Documents declassified and made available in 2013 show that in September 1970, when Vaky was the top deputy to Henry Kissinger, Vaky took a stand against Kissinger's plan to overthrow Salvador Allende who was the democratically elected president of Chile. According to the account published on the National Security Archive, Vaky wrote a memo to Kissinger arguing that coup plotting would lead to "widespread violence and even insurrection." He also argued that such a policy was immoral: "What we propose is patently a violation of our own principles and policy tenets .… If these principles have any meaning, we normally depart from them only to meet the gravest threat to us, e.g. to our survival. Is Allende a mortal threat to the U.S.? It is hard to argue this."

Family 
He had three sons Peter, Paul, and Matthew.

Peter Vaky was a Managing partner in a Private Equity firm in Atlanta, Georgia, VVS Capital.
Peter had three children with Debra Thompson. Benjamin Vaky is a Business Development Manager and married Stephanie Solley in the Summer of 2011. Christopher Vaky is a Private Banking Trader. Katherine Vaky is pursuing her Juris Doctor.

Paul Vaky is Regional Director for Central and Eastern Europe for the Office of Overseas Prosecutorial Development Assistance and Training (OPDAT), which is part of the United States Department of Justice.

Matthew Vaky is an accomplished actor/teacher. He graduated from Carnegie Mellon University in Pittsburgh with both a BFA and an MFA in Theatre and is currently a Spanish and Theatre Teacher in Washington D.C.

Positions 

 US Assistant Secretary of State for Western Hemisphere Affairs (1978–79)
 US Ambassador to Venezuela (1976)
 US Ambassador to Colombia (1974–76)
 US Ambassador to Costa Rica (1972–74)
 US National Security Council (1969–70)
 American Academy of Diplomacy 
 Carnegie Endowment for International Peace 
 Council on Foreign Relations 
 Inter-American Dialogue

References

2012 deaths
1925 births
Ambassadors of the United States to Colombia
Ambassadors of the United States to Venezuela
Ambassadors of the United States to Costa Rica
People from Corpus Christi, Texas
Walsh School of Foreign Service alumni
Walsh School of Foreign Service faculty
United States Assistant Secretaries of State
United States Foreign Service personnel
University of Chicago alumni